The First Tarnovo uprising (Parvo tarnovsko vastanie) was a Bulgarian uprising against Ottoman rule based in the former Bulgarian capital, Tarnovo, that broke out in 1598 and was severely crushed by the Ottoman authorities.

The uprising was organized by religious leaders, as well as public figures and merchants. These included the Archbishop of Tarnovo Dionysus Rallis, the noble Theodore Ballina from Nikopol, as well as the local merchants from Ragusa Pavel Đorđić and the Sorkočević brothers, with the bishops Theophanes of Lovech, Jeremiah of Rousse, Spyridon of Shumen, and Methodius of Thrace, and other high-ranking religious figures also taking part in the organization. Đorđić established relations with the Habsburgs, the Transylvanian and Wallachian rulers, and a plan for the uprising was created in Vienna in 1597.

The invasion of Wallachian forces under Michael the Brave in the northern Bulgarian lands in the autumn of 1598 provided good conditions for the uprising, as the fellow Christian army would support the insurrection according to the plan. At the time the Ottomans were engaged in the Long War with the Habsburg monarchy. An alleged descendant of the medieval Shishman dynasty was proclaimed Tsar of Bulgaria (as Shishman III) and Tarnovo was briefly liberated, with about 12,000 people gathering.

However, the Ottoman authorities reacted immediately and quickly recaptured the city using a regular army, brutally suppressing the uprising. It is unclear what the scale of the First Tarnovo Uprising was, but according to fragmentary information it may have included the regions of Ohrid, where the local archbishop was killed, as well as Sofia and Niš, where Austrian travellers mention seeing exposed dead bodies and severed human heads.

As a consequence, about 16,000 Bulgarians fled centrally-governed Ottoman territory and crossed the Danube to settle in autonomous neighbouring Wallachia, where they established a Bulgarian community.

See also
 Second Tarnovo Uprising, 1686

References and notes

Bulgarian rebellions
History of Veliko Tarnovo
Rebellions against the Ottoman Empire
1598 in Europe
16th century in Bulgaria
16th-century rebellions
Conflicts in 1598
Ottoman period in the history of Bulgaria
Rebellions in Bulgaria
1598 in the Ottoman Empire